Witold Zalewski (4 January 1921, in Siedlce – 2009) is a Polish writer, publicist and prosaist.  During the Occupation of Poland he was a soldier of Armia Krajowa and participated in Warsaw Uprising.  Zalewski was associated with conspiratory magazine Dźwigary, editorial board member of weekly magazine Pokolenie (1946–1947), publicist of Przegląd Kulturalny (1952–1963), publicist of Kultura (1963–1970).

In his works, Zalewski refers to war events, his generation, and relations between his generation and socialist realism. He analyses moral choices of war and occupation period. Zalewski is an author of one of the Polish socialist-realist book Traktory zdobędą wiosnę.

Selected works
 Mrok (1943) – debut story published in Dźwigary
 Śmiertelni bohaterowie (1946) – story
 Broń (1948) – novel
 Ranny w lesie (1960)
 Traktory zdobędą wiosnę (1950)
 Pruski mur (1964)
 Splot słoneczny (1972)
 Czarne jagody (1975)
 Dolina Królów (1976) – essay
 Odmiany nadziei (1968)
 Ostatni postój (1979) – novel about January Uprising
 Pożegnanie twierdzy (1985)
 Wysłannik (1988)
 Pożegnanie twierdzy (2000)
 Zakładnicy (2001) – novel with autobiographical elements

See also
 Socialist realism in Poland

External links

References
 
 

1921 births
2009 deaths
People from Siedlce
Home Army members
Polish male novelists
Polish publicists
Polish essayists
Male essayists
Socialist realism writers
20th-century Polish novelists
20th-century essayists
Recipients of the State Award Badge (Poland)